Mount Wollaston Cemetery is a historic rural cemetery at 20 Sea Street in the Merrymount neighborhood of Quincy, Massachusetts. It was founded in 1855 and added to the National Register of Historic Places in 1984.

History
In 1854 when Hancock Cemetery in the center of the town had been filled to near capacity, a committee was formed at a town meeting to determine the site of a new burial ground. The committee chose a plot of land in the town farm, which had been donated by William Coddington and was located just west of the site of Quincy's founding spot, Mount Wollaston. Through the year the cemetery committee surveyed several cemeteries in the surrounding area for landscaping and architecture ideas, including Forest Hills Cemetery in Jamaica Plain and Mount Auburn Cemetery in Cambridge. After consulting with Superintendent Brims of Forest Hills, Luther Briggs of Dorchester was hired to design and build the cemetery. Briggs chose a gothic revival style for the architecture, and used the plot dimensions adopted by Mount Auburn as a template for Mount Wollaston. The first two plots were ceremoniously purchased on May 5, 1856 by Charles Francis Adams, Sr., prominent attorney and son of the late former President of the United States, John Quincy Adams.

Monuments
An area known as the Veterans Section, located at the main Sea Street entrance to the cemetery, features several monuments honoring members of the military. The Civil War Monument, dedicated June 25, 1868, features a large granite monument surrounded by four period cannons. Other memorials include a Spanish–American War Memorial, World War I, World War II, Korean War and Vietnam War Memorials and statuary monuments dedicated to the city's firemen and policemen.

Notable burials

Brooks Adams (1848–1897), historian
Charles Francis Adams, Sr. (1807–1886), attorney, U.S. Congressman and ambassador to Great Britain
Charles Francis Adams, Jr. (1835–1915), a Union commander in the American Civil War, railroad executive and historian
Charles Francis Adams, III (1866–1954), yachtsman and Secretary of the Navy under President Herbert Hoover 
John Quincy Adams II (1833–1894), a politician, soldier, and lawyer 
Billy De Wolfe (1907–1974) actor 
Bob Gallagher (1928–1977), sportscaster
Ralph Talbot (1897–1918), first United States Marine Corps aviator to be awarded the Medal of Honor
Rufus Tobey, (1849–1920), founder of Tufts Childrens Hospital
Harriet E. Wilson (1825–1900), considered the first female African-American novelist

See also
National Register of Historic Places listings in Quincy, Massachusetts

References

Cemeteries on the National Register of Historic Places in Massachusetts
1855 establishments in Massachusetts
Buildings and structures in Quincy, Massachusetts
Cemeteries in Norfolk County, Massachusetts
Tourist attractions in Quincy, Massachusetts
National Register of Historic Places in Quincy, Massachusetts
Rural cemeteries
Cemeteries established in the 1850s